Kärpänkylä is a village in Kuusamo, Finland.

External links
 Kärpänkylä's location at Fonecta

Villages in Finland
Kuusamo